The Charles E. Davies House is a historic house located in Provo, Utah. It is listed on the National Register of Historic Places.

Charles E. Davies House * 388 West 300 North * Provo, Utah

The Charles Davies House was built about 1885.  “The house, a double-gable H-plan type, is the only example of the H-plan in Provo and its distinctive Victorian bay windows make it one of the best examples of such houses in the state (Historic Provo p. 8).”  The Charles E. Davies House was designated to the Provo City Historic Landmarks Registry on March 7, 1996.

Structure 

Built in the double-gable H-plan style, this home is very representative of the average home in this area during the period in which it was built.  There are several windows on the front facade of the house.  The two windows closest to the small porch in the front are relatively simple and slim, while the two double-hung sash windows on the front facade have a more elegant appearance and are each enhanced by a relieving arch hovering over them, complete with raised extrados.  The front door used to be aligned under the porch, but has subsequently been bricked in.  The west wall is adjacent to a gable.

Charles E. Davies 

Born in the country of Wales in 1859, Davies was a farmer by profession, and after he converted to the LDS Church he immigrated to the United States.  Settling down in Provo, Utah, he married Rachel E. Davis in Salt Lake City.

History of House Ownership 

David L. Van Wagenen purchased the home in 1907 from Charles E. Davies, and continued to live there until 1922 even after he sold it in 1912.  The house then passed to Eliza Smith Stewart, and then to Thomas Callister in the year 1918.  In 1920 the title passed to Georgianna Parry in 1920, who sold the house three years later to Clyde Bunnell.  The Bunnells retained the home until 1929 when the property was attained by Ray Barrett.  Madeline Hales purchased the house in 1945, and the very same year sold it to Arthur S. Roberts.  The title went to Clark S. Nelson in the Year 1950, where it remained until it was sold to Dr. Orlo Allen in 1956.  Allen sold the home to Howard L. Jensen in 1960, who sold it to Louis B. Jones later that year.

References 		

 Historic Provo. 2002 Provo City Landmarks Commission.
 Temme, Deborah R./ Cannon, Ken.  National Park Service. "National Register of Historic Places Inventory -- Nomination: Charles E. Davies House."  Summer 1980.

External links
NRHP Listings in Provo Utah

Houses in Provo, Utah
Houses on the National Register of Historic Places in Utah
National Register of Historic Places in Provo, Utah